Saint Sebastian's School is an independent, all-boys Catholic secondary school located in Needham, Massachusetts on . The school instructs young men in grades seven through twelve. Founded in 1941  by William Cardinal O'Connell, Archbishop of Boston, the school is named after Saint Sebastian, the Christian martyr who survived an attempted execution by arrows. It is the only Catholic school in the Independent School League. Approximately 350 students are enrolled, with 25% receiving financial aid. Since 1990, the School headmaster is Mr. William L. Burke III.

Academics
The School features an academic program focusing on the liberal arts and offers Spanish and Classics courses. Writing is emphasized with numerous courses in the English curriculum, with Freshmen (9th grade) students taking a special class to hone their skills. Public speaking is also a focus of the academic program, with each student required to deliver an annual speech during his class's weekly chapel meetings.

The student–teacher ratio at St. Sebastian's is 7:1. The average class size is 10. The school offers 20 classes at the Advanced Placement level. Students are assigned a faculty advisor, and at the end of every quarter, awards for honors students are presented before the school.

Athletics
St. Sebastian's has a competitive athletic program, with 11 varsity sports, and 35 teams in total. Its school colors are red and black, and teams are known as the Arrows. Over the years the Arrows have had an intense rivalry with the Belmont Hill School. St. Sebastian's School is a member of the prestigious Independent School League.

The school has one of the top ice hockey programs in the United States, dating to its founding in 1941. The school regularly produces picks in the NHL Entry Draft. In June 2003, the school was tied for the most NHL Draft picks from a single high school, ever, at four. St. Sebastian's now has five first round picks after Noah Hanifin was chosen fifth overall in 2015. The team is coached by Sean McCann, a former Harvard assistant coach and captain, and also a Hobey Baker finalist.

The campus rink, the Henry T. Lane Rink, is named in honor of Henry Lane who served the school for over 40 years, first as the Varsity Hockey coach and later the Athletic Director. Lane was also a graduate of St. Sebastian's in the class of 1949.

St. Sebastian's has had great success in recent years with lacrosse, winning ISL Championships in 2012, 2017 and 2019. The School's sailing team was also ranked seventh in the country in 2001. Additionally, the St. Sebastian's varsity golf team achieved back-to-back undefeated seasons in addition to back-to-back ISL Championship Victories in 2009 and 2010. 

Furthermore, in its 2012 season, St. Sebastian's football team recorded an undefeated record of 9–0, capturing the ISL championship, as well as the NEPSAC championship, becoming the first team in the school's history to have an undefeated season while also winning a bowl game. They won another bowl game in 2015 defeating New Hampton School by a score of 82–50. They won additional ISL Championships in 2018 and 2022. 

Also in 2017, the varsity baseball team won its first ISL Championship in ten years and managed to successfully defend its title a year later in 2018. The golf team recently capped off another championship season, for a record-breaking four ISL Championships in a row from 2016 to 2019.

The varsity lacrosse team also won the ISL Championship in 2017. After being ranked as high as #8 in the national rankings, the team was invited to the first annual Geico High School Lacrosse Nationals hosted by Catholic University and broadcast on ESPN. The Arrows took down St. Anne's-Belfield School with a final score of 21-8 and then lost 10-12 to The Hill Academy (Ontario, Canada). They were invited back to the tournament the following two seasons, losing both times in the first round to The Hill Academy and Salisbury School respectively.

After falling just short of another ISL Championship in 2018, the Arrows completed the program's first perfect season in 2019, winning yet another ISL Championship.

The varsity basketball team won the ISL Championship in 2022.

Extracurricular activities
St. Sebastian's has 6 student publications and 33 different clubs and activities.
The school newspaper, The Walrus, is published monthly. The school's debate team competes among private secondary schools in New England. Other student groups manage The Arrow, the school yearbook, as well as The Quiver, a creative literary magazine, and The St. Sebastian's Journal, a collection of student-written scholarly essays. Other students run the school's closed-circuit television network, perform community service (The Arrow Club and Labels Are For Jars), perform in dramatic productions, compete in such activities as chess, robotics, support students of color (MPA), and advocate against destructive decisions such as drug and alcohol abuse (SADD).

The Guild of St. Irene
The Guild is the school's association for the mothers of students, rather like the PTA. Founded in 1949, the Guild works for the enhancement of St. Sebastian's School through social events, fund-raising, and volunteer activities. It is named after St. Irene, who befriended and healed St. Sebastian.

Traditions
Red & Black Day: A field day in which the student body is split into two teams (Red and Black). During the day these teams compete in competitive events like tug-o-war, flag football, wiffleball, frisbee golf, and Jenga. This day promotes school spirit and unity through healthy competition.
Painting The Hills: On the day before St. Sebastian's homecoming, the students paint the numbers and nicknames of the varsity football and soccer players on the hills that overlook the respective fields. Unity Day: The Friday after the first quarter ends, students participate in "fishbowl" activities, talk in groups consisting of students in different grades, and listen to some alumni.  This day promotes the act of coming together, and becoming more united, especially with students of different races, social backgrounds, interests, and religions.
 Black History Month Assembly: Each year during Black History Month the students of MPA organize an assembly to appreciate the most celebrated heroes among African Americans.

Notable alumni

Politics and government service
 William B. Evans, former Commissioner of the Boston Police Department, current Chief of Police at Boston College
 Paul G. Kirk, former US Senator and Chairman of the Democratic National Committee
 Kevin E. Moley, US Permanent Representative to the United Nations in Geneva
James H. Maloney, former Member of the United States House of Representatives, representing the Fifth District of Connecticut 
 Lawrence O'Donnell, Congressional Staffer, MSNBC host and writer/producer for NBC's The West Wing

Sports
 Tony Barros, player for the Cape Verde national basketball team
 Rick DiPietro, former NHL goaltender for the New York Islanders 
 Mike Grier, former NHL winger, current General Manager of the San Jose Sharks
 Joe Hulbig, former NHL forward and Edmonton Oilers first round draft pick
 Mike Morris, former AHL forward and San Jose Sharks first round draft pick
 Mike Smith (baseball player), former MLB pitcher
 Noah Welch, former NHL defenseman and Olympian
 Brian Boyle (ice hockey), former NHL forward
 Richard Pitino, men's basketball coach at University of New Mexico
 Carl Corazzini, former NHL forward
 Matt Duffy, former MLB infielder for the Houston Astros
 Danny O'Regan, professional hockey player currently in the Detroit Red Wings organization
 Noah Hanifin, current NHL defenseman for the Calgary Flames
 Connor Strachan, former NFL linebacker and special teamer for the Houston Texans
 Kevin Regan, former AHL goaltender and draft pick of the Boston Bruins
 Sean Sullivan, former AHL defenseman and draft pick of the Phoenix Coyotes
 Drew Commesso, former Olympic ice hockey goaltender and second round draft pick of the Chicago Blackhawks
 Albie O'Connell, former Boston University men's ice hockey coach
 Mike Pandolfo, former NHL forward for the Columbus Blue Jackets
 Chris Kelleher, former NHL defenseman for the Boston Bruins
 Ryan Lannon, former AHL defenseman and draft pick of the Pittsburgh Penguins

Other
 John Slattery, Emmy-nominated screen and stage actor, best known for his role on AMC's series Mad Men
 Bob Arnot, American physician and television personality

Notes

References
 St. Sebastian's School profile provided by schooltree.org

External links
 Saint Sebastian's School website
 Saint Sebastian's School fact sheet

Boys' schools in Massachusetts
Educational institutions established in 1941
Independent School League
Catholic secondary schools in Massachusetts
Private middle schools in Massachusetts
1941 establishments in Massachusetts